Ossory, a division of Queen's County, was a constituency in Ireland, returning one Member of Parliament to the United Kingdom House of Commons from 1885 to 1918.

Prior to the 1885 general election and after the dissolution of Parliament in 1918 the area was part of the Queen's County constituency. After the establishment of the Irish Free State in 1922, it was not represented in the UK Parliament, as Laois was no longer part of the United Kingdom.

Boundaries
This constituency comprised the western part of Queen's County now known as County Laois.

The Redistribution of Seats Act 1885 defined the division as including the Baronies of Clandonagh, Clarmallagh, Maryborough West, Tinnahinch, and Upper Woods, and that part of the Barony of Portnahinch contained within the parish of Ardea.

Members of Parliament

Note:-
 a O'Connor was returned by more than one seat and elected to sit for East Donegal.

Elections

Elections in the 1880s

O'Connor is also elected MP for East Donegal and opts to sit there, causing a by-election.

Elections in the 1890s

Elections in the 1900s

Elections in the 1910s

Delany's death causes a by-election.

References

Historic constituencies in County Laois
Westminster constituencies in Queen's County (historic)
Constituencies of the Parliament of the United Kingdom established in 1885
Constituencies of the Parliament of the United Kingdom disestablished in 1918